This is a list of landscape painters of the Russian Federation, Soviet Union, and Russian Empire, both ethnic Russians and people of other ethnicities. This list also includes painters who were born in Russia but later emigrated, and those born elsewhere but immigrated to the country and/or worked there for a long time. Artists are arranged in chronological order within the alphabetical tables. The basis for inclusion in this List can serve as the recognition of the artistic community, confirmed by authoritative sources, as well as the presence of article about the artist in Wikipedia.

For the full list of Russian artists in Wikipedia, see :Category:Russian artists.

Alphabetical list


A

B

C

D

E

G

K

L

M

N

O

P

R

S

T

V

See also
 List of Russian artists
 List of 19th-century Russian painters
 List of 20th-century Russian painters
 List of painters of Saint Petersburg Union of Artists
 Russian culture

Sources
 Fedorov-Davidov А. А. Soviet landscape painting. - Moscow: Iskusstvo, 1958.
 Fedorov-Davidov A. A. Russian landscape painting.  - Moscow: Izobrazitelnoe Iskusstvo, 1962.
 Sitnina М. К. The Seasons of year. Russian landscape painting.  - Moscow: Iskusstvo, 1969.
 Artists of peoples of the USSR. Biobibliography Dictionary. Vol. 1. - Moscow: Iskusstvo, 1970.
 Artists of peoples of the USSR. Biobibliography Dictionary. Vol. 2. - Moscow: Iskusstvo, 1972.
 Fine Arts of the Leningrad. Exhibition Catalogue. - Leningrad: Khudozhnik RSFSR, 1976.
 Directory of Members of Union of Artists of USSR. Vol. 1,2. - Moscow: Soviet Artist Edition, 1979.
 Directory of Members of the Leningrad branch of the Union of Artists of Russian Federation. - Leningrad: Khudozhnik RSFSR, 1980.
 Artists of peoples of the USSR. Biobibliography Dictionary. Vol. 4 Book 1. - Moscow: Iskusstvo, 1983.
 Directory of Members of the Leningrad branch of the Union of Artists of Russian Federation. - Leningrad: Khudozhnik RSFSR, 1987.
 Artists of peoples of the USSR. Biobibliography Dictionary. Vol. 4 Book 2. - Saint Petersburg: Academic project humanitarian agency, 1995.
 Link of Times: 1932 - 1997. Artists - Members of Saint Petersburg Union of Artists of Russia. Exhibition catalogue. - Saint Petersburg: Manezh Central Exhibition Hall, 1997.
 Matthew C. Bown. Dictionary of 20th Century Russian and Soviet Painters 1900-1980s. - London: Izomar, 1998.
 Matthew C. Bown. Socialist Realist Painting. - Yale Press, 1998.
 Maltseva F. Masters of Russian landscape painting of second half of XIX century. - Moscow: Iskusstvo, 1999.
 Vern G. Swanson. Soviet Impressionism. - Woodbridge, England: Antique Collectors' Club, 2001.
 Sergei V. Ivanov. Unknown Socialist Realism. The Leningrad School. - Saint Petersburg: NP-Print Edition, 2007. - , .
 Anniversary Directory graduates of Saint Petersburg State Academic Institute of Painting, Sculpture, and Architecture named after Ilya Repin, Russian Academy of Arts. 1915 - 2005. - Saint Petersburg: Pervotsvet Publishing House, 2007.
 Igor N. Pishny. The Leningrad School of painting. Socialist realism of 1930-1980s: Selected names. – Saint Petersburg: Kolomenskaya versta, 2008. - .
 Irina Romanycheva. Academic Dacha. History and traditions. - Saint Petersburg: Petropol Publishing House, 2009.

External links 
 Spring Motives in Painting of 1950-1990s. The Leningrad School (VIDEO)
 Landscape Painting of Vladimir Ivanovich Ovchinnikov (1911-1978, VIDEO)
 Landscape Painting of Nikolai Efimovich Timkov (1912-1993, VIDEO)
 Landscape Painting of Sergei Ivanovich Osipov (1915-1985, VIDEO)
 Landscape Painting of Nikolai Nikolaevich Galakhov (b. 1928, VIDEO)

Landscape
Painters from Saint Petersburg
Repin Institute of Arts alumni
 
Russian landscape